Camille Foucaux (22 April 1906 – 21 October 1976) was a French racing cyclist. He rode in the 1929 Tour de France.

References

External links
 

1906 births
1976 deaths
French male cyclists
Place of birth missing